The Tristar Gym is a mixed martial arts training centre located in Le Triangle Borough in Montreal, Quebec, Canada. Instructors at the gym include Firas Zahabi, Conrad Pla and Georges St-Pierre. Tristar Gym is one of the top professional MMA training camps.

History
The gym was established in 1991 by Conrad Pla, Michel Lavallée and Ron Di Cecco. The three owners was the basis for the name of the gym. Alexandre Choko joined the gym as a fighter in 1992 and eventually bought the gym in 2001. In 2008 he sold the gym to Firas Zahabi. Zahabi had become Georges St-Pierre’s main coach after GSP’s loss to Matt Serra (UFC 69). In addition to being the current owner Zahabi is also the head coach at the gym. In 2021, owner Firas Zahabi detailed how his gym had been regularly harassed by the Montreal police force during the Covid-19 pandemic.

Notable fighters

Current

Kevin Lee - Former UFC Interim Lightweight Title Challenger
 Johnny Walker - Current UFC Light Heavyweight
Hatsu Hioki
Robert Whittaker - Former UFC Middleweight Champion
Tom Watson
Andy Main
John Makdessi - Current UFC Lightweight
Francis Carmont - Current Bellator Light Heavyweight
Anthony Smith
Ryan Ford
Alex Garcia - Former UFC Welterweight
Olivier Aubin-Mercier - Former  UFC Lightweight
Joseph Duffy - Former UFC Lightweight
Kajan Johnson
Randa Markos - Current UFC W's Strawweight
Sage Northcutt - Current ONE Welterweight
Tom Breese
Nordine Taleb - Current UFC Welterweight
Chad Laprise
Joanne Calderwood - Current UFC W's Flyweight
Stevie Ray (MMA) - Former UFC Lightweight
Arnold Allen (fighter) - Current UFC Featherweight
Mickey Gall - Current UFC Welterweight
Aiemann Zahabi - Current UFC Bantamweight
Vitor Belfort - Former UFC Light Heavyweight Champion
Jonathan Meunier - Former UFC Welterweight
Myles Jury - Former UFC Featherweight
Elias Theodorou - Former UFC Middleweight
Mirsad Bektic- Current UFC Featherweight
Ryan Hall (grappler) - Current UFC Featherweight
Devon Larratt - Current left and right arm World Armwrestling League Heavyweight Champion

Past

 Georges St-Pierre - Former UFC Middleweight Champion, Former UFC Welterweight Champion, 9 title defenses (13 title summary - the most ever)
Rory MacDonald - Former Bellator Welterweight champion, Former UFC #2 Welterweight Contender, Former UFC Welterweight Title Challenger
 Kenny Florian - Former UFC 2-Time Lightweight and Featherweight Title Challenger
 Miguel Torres - Former WEC Bantamweight Champion, 3 title defenses
 David Loiseau - Former UFC Middleweight Title Contender
 Denis Kang - 2006 Pride Welterweight Grand Prix Runner-Up
 Nick Denis
 Ivan Menjivar
 Yves Jabouin
 Mark Boček
 Rick Hawn
 Alex Garcia (fighter)
 Mike Ricci

See also
List of Top Professional MMA Training Camps

References

1991 establishments in Canada
Mixed martial arts training facilities
Sport in Montreal
1991 establishments in Quebec